The Professional Secrets of Dr. Apfelgluck or Les secrets professionnels du Dr Apfelglück is a 1991 French comedy film directed by Alessandro Capone, Stéphane Clavier, Thierry Lhermitte, Mathias Ledoux and Hervé Palud.

Plot
Dr. Apfelglück, a prominent psychiatrist, recounts some of the more serious cases that came to him.

Cast

 Thierry Lhermitte as Doctor Apfelglück
 Jacques Villeret as Martineau
 Alessandro Haber as Jean-Luc
 Véronique Genest as Micheline
 Ennio Fantastichini as Alain
 Alain Chabat as Gérard Martinez
 Dominique Lavanant as Jacqueline Vidart
 Roland Giraud as Émile Leberck
 Zabou Breitman as Carole Ribéra
 Daniel Gélin as Roland Grumaud
 Renato Scarpa as Michel Martinelli
 Pascal Sevran as Alain Laurent
 Valérie Mairesse as Astrée
 Gérard Jugnot as Martini
 Jean Yanne as Germain
 Luis Rego as Monsieur Gomez
 Laurent Gamelon as Maurice
 Laurence Ashley as Anne Métayer
 Louba Guertchikoff as Old Anne Métayer
 Micha Bayard as Mother Tonnerre
 Philippe Bruneau as Jean-Paul Tarade
 Doudou Babet as Georges Bellerive
 Jacqueline Rouillard as Madame Garaud
 Carole Jacquinot as Marinette
 Ginette Garcin as Old Marinette
 Josiane Balasko as The scientist
 Christian Clavier as The lawyer
 Michel Blanc as The Hindu
 Charlotte de Turckheim as The Spanish
 Martin Lamotte as The Spanish
 Alexandra Vandernoot as The Belgian
 Francis Lemaire as The Belgian
 Ticky Holgado as The hotelier
 Claire Nadeau as The hotelier
 Jean-Marie Bigard as The Café owner
 Bruno Moynot as The consumer's bistro
 Dominique Farrugia as The sellor
 Mouss Diouf as The nurse

References

External links

1991 films
1991 comedy films
French comedy films
1990s French-language films
Films directed by Stéphane Clavier
Films directed by Alessandro Capone
Films directed by Hervé Palud
1990s French films